Peter Anthony Creamer (born 20 September 1953 in Hartlepool) is an English former professional footballer who played as a defender in the Football League for Middlesbrough, York City, Doncaster Rovers, Hartlepool United and Rochdale, and in the North American Soccer League for the Dallas Tornado.

References

External links
 
 NASL stats at NASL Jerseys

1953 births
Living people
Footballers from Hartlepool
English footballers
Association football defenders
Middlesbrough F.C. players
York City F.C. players
Dallas Tornado players
Doncaster Rovers F.C. players
Hartlepool United F.C. players
Rochdale A.F.C. players
English Football League players
North American Soccer League (1968–1984) players
English expatriate sportspeople in the United States
Expatriate soccer players in the United States
English expatriate footballers